is the biggest of the "Big Four" law firms in Japan, as of January 2018, by number of lawyers.

History
The firm's current form was established in 2007 by the acquisition of the Kokusai Bumon (International Division) of Asahi Law Offices (the former Asahi Koma Law Offices, itself a merger of the Masuda & Ejiri and Komatsu Koma law firms) by Nishimura & Partners (one of the "Big Four" and founded in 1966). The firm is a member of the international legal network Lex Mundi.

In August 2012 it opened offices in Nagoya and Osaka to assist clients based outside of Tokyo.

Clients and services
The Legal 500 ranks N&A as a top tier firm in the fields of antitrust and competition law, banking and finance, capital markets, construction, projects and energy, corporate and M&A, dispute resolution, real estate and structured finance/securitisation. Chambers & Partners ranks the firm as "Band 1" in banking and finance, securitisation and structured finance, corporate and M&A, dispute resolution, real estate and restructuring/insolvency.

N&A clients include América Móvil, Citibank, France Telecom, Fuji Fire and Marine Insurance, KDDI, Microsoft, Mizuho Securities, Nippon Steel, NTT, Oriental Land, Tokyo Broadcasting System and Universal Studios Japan.

Offices

Nishimura is headquartered in Tokyo (Otemachi) and has domestic branch offices in Fukuoka, Nagoya (JR Central Towers) and Osaka. It also has overseas offices in Bangkok, Beijing, Dubai, Dusseldorf, Hanoi, Ho Chi Minh City, Hong Kong (Okada Law Firm), Jakarta, Shanghai, Singapore and Yangon.

References

External links 
 

Law firms of Japan
Law firms established in 1966
1966 establishments in Japan